Caloptilia geminata is a moth of the family Gracillariidae. It is known from Japan (Honshū).

The wingspan is 10–13.5 mm.

The larvae feed on Vaccinium hirtum and Vaccinium smallii. They probably mine the leaves of their host plant.

References

geminata
Moths described in 1966
Moths of Japan